Antonis Martis (born 8 September 2000) is a Cypriot professional footballer who plays as a midfielder for AEK Larnaca.

Club career
Martis is a youth academy graduate of Danish club Midtjylland. On 21 October 2020, he joined A-League club Macarthur FC on a season long loan deal. He made his professional debut on 9 January 2021 in a 1–1 draw against Wellington Phoenix. In August 2021, it was announced that Midtjylland and Macarthur extended Martis's loan deal by another season. On 9 January 2022, his loan spell ended early as he was recalled by Midtjylland.

International career
Born in Cyprus, Martis moved to Australia when he was three. He is eligible to play for both nations. Martis has captained Australia under-16 team at 2016 AFC U-16 Championship qualifiers and have played for Cyprus under-19 team at 2019 UEFA European Under-19 Championship qualifiers.

References

External links
 

2000 births
Living people
Association football midfielders
Australia youth international soccer players
Cyprus youth international footballers
A-League Men players
Macarthur FC players
Australian soccer players
Cypriot footballers
Cypriot expatriate footballers
Expatriate men's footballers in Denmark
FC Midtjylland players